Ben Gross was an American Negro league outfielder in the 1880s.

Gross played for the Pittsburgh Keystones in 1887. In six recorded games, he posted eight hits in 26 plate appearances.

References

External links
Baseball statistics and player information from Baseball-Reference Black Baseball Stats and Seamheads

Year of birth missing
Year of death missing
Place of birth missing
Place of death missing
Pittsburgh Keystones players